Mark S. Gordon is a professor of chemistry at Iowa State University, and Ames Laboratory working in the area of computational quantum chemistry.  He is a member of The International Academy of Quantum Molecular Science.

Mark Gordon received his B.S. from Rensselaer Polytechnic Institute, followed by a PhD. from Carnegie Mellon working under the supervision of John Pople, followed by a postdoctoral stint with Klaus Ruedenberg at Iowa State University.  He was on the faculty at North Dakota State University until 1993 when he moved to Iowa State University.

He is well known for his work with the GAMESS (US) quantum chemistry program.

References 

Living people
Members of the International Academy of Quantum Molecular Science
Carnegie Mellon University alumni
Iowa State University faculty
1942 births
Computational chemists
Theoretical chemists
Fellows of the American Physical Society